Miladin Peković (born June 18, 1983) is a Serbian retired professional basketball player.

External links

References

1983 births
Living people
Basketball players from Belgrade
EWE Baskets Oldenburg players
Keravnos B.C. players
KK Avala Ada players
KK Ergonom players
KK Lavovi 063 players
KK Mega Basket players
KK Proleter Zrenjanin players
BKK Radnički players
Serbian expatriate basketball people in Germany
Serbian expatriate basketball people in Cyprus
Serbian expatriate basketball people in Romania
Serbian expatriate basketball people in North Macedonia
Serbian men's basketball players
Shooting guards